Jeremy Bates and Kevin Curren were the defending champions but they competed with different partners that year, Bates with Nick Brown and Curren with Neil Broad.

Broad and Curren lost in the second round to Bates and Brown.

Bates and Brown lost in the quarterfinals to Piet Norval and Brad Pearce.

Todd Woodbridge and Mark Woodforde won in the final 6–4, 7–6 against Grant Connell and Glenn Michibata.

Seeds
The top four seeded teams received byes into the second round.

Draw

Finals

Top half

Bottom half

External links
 1991 Stella Artois Championships Doubles Draw

Doubles